D'oh! is an exclamation popularized by the fictional character Homer Simpson.

Doh, D'oh, DoH, or DOH may also refer to:

Places
Doh (crater), on Jupiter's moon Callisto
Doh, Ivory Coast, a village in Woroba District
Doh, a village in Măeriște Commune, Romania

Acronyms and codes
 Department of Health
 DOH, the IATA code for Hamad International Airport in Doha, Qatar
 DOH or 2,5-Dimethoxy-amphetamine, a psychedelic amphetamine
 Deutscher Orden der Harugari (German Order of Harugari), a fraternal organization for German-Americans
 DoH, DNS over HTTPS

Department of Highways
 Department of Highways, which shares responsibilities with the Department of Rural Roads, Thailand
 Predecessor of the Washington State Department of Transportation, United States
 Predecessor of the Ministry of Transportation of Ontario, Canada

Other uses
 Doh, alternative spelling of the musical note Do
Félix Doh (died 2003), rebel leader in Côte d'Ivoire
 Doh, the boss in the Arkanoid series of video games
 Doh, the fiber of the gomuti palm
 DfT OLR Holdings, UK government holding company

See also

Do (disambiguation) 
Doe (disambiguation) 
Dough (disambiguation)